Oxyepoecus is a Neotropical genus of ant in the subfamily Myrmicinae. The genus is a member of the tribe Solenopsidini and currently includes 20 species.

Distribution
The genus of is known from the Neotropics, from Colombia to Chile, where it is collected infrequently.

Identification
Oxyepoecus is differentiated from other Solenopsidini by the 11-segmented antennae with a three-segmented apical club, the clypeus with four teeth, and the dentate propodeum. In addition, the petiole and postpetiole nodes are high and often anteroposteriorly compressed.

Biology
The biology of the genus is poorly known, but three species (O. inquilinus, O. daguerrei, and O. bruchi) are suspected to be inquilines of Pheidole or Solenopsis, although the exact nature of the relationship is unclear. These three species are considered as "Vulnerable D2" by IUCN, meaning they are suspected to be "facing a high risk of extinction in the wild in the medium-term future" because "their populations are characterized by an acute restriction in their area of occupancy (typically less than 100 km2) or in the number of locations (typically fewer than five)."

Species

Oxyepoecus bidentatus Delsinne & Mackay, 2011
Oxyepoecus browni Albuquerque & Brandão, 2004
Oxyepoecus bruchi Santschi, 1926
Oxyepoecus crassinodus Kempf, 1974
Oxyepoecus daguerrei (Santschi, 1933)
Oxyepoecus ephippiatus Albuquerque & Brandão, 2004
Oxyepoecus inquilinus (Kusnezov, 1952)
Oxyepoecus kempfi Albuquerque & Brandão, 2004
Oxyepoecus longicephalus Albuquerque & Brandão, 2004
Oxyepoecus mandibularis (Emery, 1913)
Oxyepoecus myops Albuquerque & Brandão, 2009
Oxyepoecus plaumanni Kempf, 1974
Oxyepoecus punctifrons (Borgmeier, 1927)
Oxyepoecus quadratus Albuquerque & Brandão, 2004
Oxyepoecus rastratus (Mayr, 1887)
Oxyepoecus reticulatus Kempf, 1974
Oxyepoecus rosai Albuquerque & Brandão, 2009
Oxyepoecus striatus Mackay & Delsinne, 2011
Oxyepoecus vezenyii (Forel, 1907)
Oxyepoecus vivax Kempf, 1974

References

External links

Myrmicinae
Ant genera
Taxonomy articles created by Polbot